Forest View High School is a state co-educational secondary school located on the western outskirts of Tokoroa, New Zealand. It opened in 1974 and serves students in years 9 to 13. It is one of two secondary schools at Tokoroa, the other being Tokoroa High School. Like many New Zealand state secondary schools of 1970s construction, the school was built to the S68 design, characterised by single-storey classroom blocks with concrete block walls, low-pitched roofs and internal open courtyards.

Notable alumni

 Geoff Alley - Waikato N.P.C Cap #873: 1989, 3 games. NZ 7s 1992
 Tim Armstrong- notable New Zealand musician The Politicians was a founding pupil in 1974
 Willie Bishop - Australian Sevens squad 2009
 Isaac Boss - Ireland national rugby union team; Waikato N.P.C Cap #964: 1999, 2001–05, 52 games; Waikato Chiefs Super Rugby
 Quade Cooper - Wallabies, Queensland Reds, Australian Schoolboys Rugby Team 2002
 Ian Foster - current All Blacks coach, Waikato Rugby team
 Michael Gielen (born 2 June 1971) Auxiliary Bishop of the Roman Catholic Diocese of Auckland was Deputy Head Boy in 1989.
 Jasin Goldsmith - All Blacks #893 (1988); Waikato N.P.C Cap #847: 1987–88, 24 games
 Isaac John - New Zealand and Cook Islands representative rugby league player
 Richard Kahui - All Blacks #1076 2008–11; Waikato Chiefs Super Rugby 2007–11; Waikato N.P.C Cap #1018: 2004–06, 2008–11, 36 games
 James Kamana - New Zealand Sevens Squad 2008, Waikato Chiefs Super Rugby 2007–08; Waikato N.P.C Cap #1050: 2007–08, 13 games
 Monique Williams - New Zealand's fastest female sprinter, Australian 100 and 200m National champion (2007)

References

External links
School website

Secondary schools in Waikato
Educational institutions established in 1974
New Zealand secondary schools of S68 plan construction
Tokoroa